The City of Vaughan 2000 Municipal Election took place on 13 November 2000.  One mayor, two regional councillors and five local councillors were elected for the city of Vaughan, Ontario, Canada.  In addition, local school trustees were elected to the York Region District School Board, York Catholic District School Board, Conseil scolaire de district du Centre-Sud-Ouest and Conseil scolaire de district catholique Centre-Sud.  These elections were held in conjunction with all other municipalities across Ontario. (see 2000 Ontario municipal elections).

Following the death of Mayor Lorna Jackson on April 5, 2002, Michael Di Biase was appointed by Vaughan council as interim mayor by virtue of his position as one of two regional councillors representing Vaughan. Gino Rosati, a Vaughan local councillor, was subsequently appointed by Vaughan Council to fill Di Biase’s position as regional councillor and a by-election was held on June 14, 2002 to fill Rosati’s local councillor’s position which was won by Linda Jackson.

Candidates

Mayor

Regional Council

Because Michael Di Biase received the highest vote count among the candidates for Regional Councillor, he was styled as the acting Mayor in cases where the Mayor is unavailable.  However commonly confused, this is a different role than being the Deputy Mayor

Local Council

Ward 1

Ward 2

Ward 3

Ward 4

Ward 5

Ward 2 By-election 
Held on June 14, 2002

External links
 Vaughan Votes 2000

2000 Ontario municipal elections